Do You Have The Same But In Pants? is the first demo and debut EP by the Swiss punk rock band Hateful Monday, released in 2000 through Trash Compost Records. Only 200 copies were ever printed.

Track listing

Personnel 
Reverend Seb – vocals, guitar
Igor Gonzola – drums
Myriam K. – guitar, backing vocals
Mark Sman – bass guitar

References

2000 EPs
Hateful Monday albums